Natasha Zvereva and Jim Pugh were the defending champions but lost in the quarterfinals to Pam Shriver and Mark Kratzmann.

Jo Durie and Jeremy Bates won in the final 2–6, 6–4, 6–4 against Robin White and Scott Davis.

Seeds
Champion seeds are indicated in bold text while text in italics indicates the round in which those seeds were eliminated.

Draw

Final

Top half

Bottom half

References
 1991 Australian Open – Doubles draws and results at the International Tennis Federation

Mixed Doubles
Australian Open (tennis) by year – Mixed doubles